Winstead PC is a national corporate law firm with offices in Texas, New York, and North Carolina. The firm's more than 300 attorneys and consultants serve as legal advisors to mid-market and large businesses, providing legal services to industries including airlines, financial services, healthcare, higher education, investment management/private funds, life sciences, real estate and sports business & media. Winstead's attorneys and practices have been recognized by Chambers USA, Chambers and Partners, 2021; Super Lawyers, Thomson Reuters, 2021; and The Best Lawyers in America, Woodward/White, Inc., 2021.

Offices 
Winstead PC has eight offices across the United States, including Austin, Charlotte, Dallas, Fort Worth, Houston, New York City, San Antonio, and The Woodlands.

Headquarters 
In 2012, Winstead's headquarters in Dallas relocated to the Winstead Building located at 2728 N. Harwood Street in Dallas, Texas. Prior to that, Winstead PC occupied Renaissance Tower after moving from the Mercantile National Bank complex in 1986.

History 

Winstead was founded in 1973 by three young Dallas lawyers, including current name shareholder Pete Winstead. By the end of the 1980s, the Dallas practice had expanded to more than 170 attorneys, with additional offices in Houston and Austin.  Acquisitions of existing firms in Fort Worth, The Woodlands and Washington, D.C. resulted in greater expansion of client services.

Sources

External links

 Winstead PC

Companies based in Dallas
Law firms established in 1973
Law firms based in Dallas
1973 establishments in Texas